40 Aquarii is a star in the equatorial constellation of Aquarius. 40 Aquarii is its Flamsteed designation; it was too faint to be included in the Bright Star Catalogue. The brightness of this star is below the normal limit for visibility with the naked eye, having an apparent visual magnitude of 6.93. It is moving closer to the Earth with a heliocentric radial velocity of -3 km/s. 40 Aquarii is positioned near the ecliptic and thus is subject to lunar occultations.

The stellar classification for 40 Aquarii is G5 IV, matching a G-type, yellow-hued subgiant star that has exhausted the supply of hydrogen at its core and has begun to evolve into a giant. It is around 100 million years old with 10 times the girth of the Sun. The star is radiating 154 times the luminosity of the Sun from its photosphere at an effective temperature of 5,355 K.

References

G-type subgiants
Aquarius (constellation)
Durchmusterung objects
Aquarii, 040
210845
109720